The English Professional Championship was a professional snooker tournament which was open only for English players.

History 
The championship was first played in 1981 in Birmingham. Steve Davis won the first title by defeating Tony Meo in the final.

In 1985 the competition was revived again and received financial support from the WPBSA, along with professional championship in Scotland, Wales, Ireland, Canada, Australia and South Africa). After WPBSA financial support ended after the 1988/89 edition, the tournament was unable to find a sponsor has not been held since.

Winners

References

 
Snooker non-ranking competitions
Snooker competitions in England
Defunct snooker competitions